Infancy is a bimonthly peer-reviewed scientific journal covering developmental psychology in infancy, which it defines as the first two years of life. It was established in 2000 and is published by Wiley-Blackwell on behalf of the International Congress of Infant Studies, of which it is the official journal. 

The editor-in-chief is John Colombo (University of Kansas). According to the Journal Citation Reports, the journal has a 2017 impact factor of 1.873, ranking it 35th out of 73 journals in the category "Psychology, Developmental".

References

External links

Publications established in 2000
Wiley-Blackwell academic journals
Developmental psychology journals
Infancy
Bimonthly journals
English-language journals
Academic journals associated with international learned and professional societies